Zhang Xin (Western name: Asta Xin Zhang; born 1 December 1998) is a Chinese skateboarder. She has competed in women's park events at several World Skateboarding Championships, finishing 19th in 2018 and 25th in 2019.

Zhang placed fifteenth in the preliminary round of the women's park event at the 2021 Tokyo Olympics.

References

External links
 
 Asta Xin Zhang at The Boardr

Living people
1998 births
Chinese skateboarders
Female skateboarders
Olympic skateboarders of China
Skateboarders at the 2020 Summer Olympics
Sportspeople from Xiangtan
Chinese sportswomen
Medalists at the 2018 Asian Games
Skateboarders at the 2018 Asian Games
Asian Games bronze medalists for China
Asian Games medalists in skateboarding